"Best Day of My Life" is a 2013 song by American Authors.

Best Day of My Life may also refer to:

 "Best Day of My Life", a song by Aunty Donna from their 2018 album The Album
 "Best Day of My Life", a song by Simple Plan from their 2022 album Harder Than It Looks
 Here and Now (2018 film), formerly known as Best Day of My Life

See also
 "Best Days of Your Life", a 2008 song by Kellie Pickler